The Kŭmsŏng class ("Gold Star") locomotives are an unlicensed copy of the Soviet-made M62-type diesel locomotive, built by the Kim Chong-t'ae Electric Locomotive Works in P'yŏngyang, North Korea.

Description
Starting in 1967, the Voroshilovgrad Locomotive Factory in Voroshilovgrad, USSR (now Luhansk, Ukraine), began production of 64 K62-class variants of the M62 for the Korean State Railway. The Kim Chong-t'ae works subsequently reverse-engineered these locomotives, along with their diesel engines and other components imported from the USSR. These efforts led to the production of the Kŭmsŏng class locomotives using both copied components and Russian-made parts.

However, reliability issues prevented mass production. The second unit, 8002, has been on display at the Three Revolutions Exhibition in P'yŏngyang since it was built. The first two units were both painted in a yellow and red livery, strikingly different from the blue and green scheme applied to the Soviet-made versions. 8001 is in service, pulling trains on the P'yŏngŭi Line.

There are a number of noticeable external differences between the Kŭmsŏng class locomotives and the Soviet-built M62s. The most immediately evident is the number and arrangement of the side windows, and the shape of the cab windows. Also very different are the headlights: the top light is round on the Kŭmsŏng instead of rectangular, and the main headlights are mounted in pairs, and higher up, than on the M62. Another readily noticeable difference is that the bogie frames are constructed with welded steel profiles.

Conversions to electric
Like the M62, some Kŭmsŏng class locomotives have also been converted to Kanghaenggun-class electric locomotives. Two have been seen so far - #0309 in dark green and white, and #399 in dark blue and white, but it is not known whether these were converted from existing Kŭmsŏng class locomotives originally built as diesels, or if the electrics use newly built bodies.

References

Diesel-electric locomotives of North Korea
Diesel-electric locomotives of the Soviet Union
Co′Co′ locomotives
Kim Chong-tae Works locomotives
Standard gauge locomotives of North Korea